The Whip was a ride originally designed and built by W.F. Mangels Company of Coney Island, New York, United States. William F. Mangels patented the ride in 1914 and it soon became extremely popular.

The ride consists of two circular wheel-like turn-table platforms on opposing sides of a rectangular base. Motors turn a cable that leads a number of 2–3 person seater cars that are attached, around a laminated wooden track. The ride follows the track while the cable turns. When the car reaches one of the turn-table platforms, the speed picks up forcing riders to one side as the car whips around the corner. Whips with 8, 10, or 12 cars were available. At least two 16-car models exist, one operating at Kennywood and the other in storage at Knoebels. The Whip is commonly found at older, historic parks.

A children's version was also built that looked exactly like the full size version. A children's roto-whip was also produced and is in a circular motion that whips the cars as it goes around. The children's roto-whips are more common today than the full-scale versions.

The Whip's name could lead many to believe it is an aggressive thrill ride but most are actually very tame. The normal minimum rider height requirement is 46 inches tall unless with an adult at most parks, even though most whips are rarely aggressive rides. The version at Knoebel's has non-lockable restraints, and riders can easily get out during the ride's rotation, which may add reason to these restrictions.

The Whip spread to other countries such as England. During the 1930s, the English poet John Betjeman described St Giles' Fair in Oxford as follows:

Today
Two of the oldest Whips operating today are at Dorney Park & Wildwater Kingdom in Allentown, Pennsylvania, manufactured in 1918, and Kennywood Park in West Mifflin, Pennsylvania, manufactured in 1926.  The Whip at Playland in Rye, New York was made in 1928, and is one of the park's oldest rides. Another installation of a classic Whip is at Knoebels Grove in Elysburg, PA. This whip, called the "Whipper" was originally installed at a park in Hunlock Creek, PA called Croops Glen moved to Knoebels in the 1940s after that park closed.  These rides have become increasingly rare.  There are a small handful located in the North-Eastern United States. There is still an original "The Whip" in Camden Park Huntington, West Virginia, as well as "The Whip Jr." 

Another Whip is in Operation at Heritage Park Historical Village in Calgary, Canada

A modern version Whip is currently manufactured by Sellner Manufacturing, which also makes a modern version of the Tilt-a-Whirl ride.

Throughout urban areas in America, Mobile Whip Rides were once prevalent on the streets of many cities. These are considered truck mounted portable amusement devices.  Mobile Whip Rides such as this still exist in the New York City area and are rented out for block parties, street fairs and birthday parties.cities.

References

Amusement rides introduced in 1914
Amusement rides
Coney Island